The following are the 15 provinces of Cuba, along with their demonym or adjective form. Per Spanish morphology, the collective plural is made by adding an -s to pluralize the masculine singular forms listed, as in Cuba: cubano [masculine singular], cubana [feminine singular], cubanos [masculine plural] and cubanas [feminine plural].

The majority of these provinces are named after their capital city, with the exception of:

 Mayabeque (San José de las Lajas, lajero/-a; this adjective also refers to Santa Isabel de las Lajas, also known simply as Lajas),
 Villa Clara (Santa Clara, santaclareño/-a),
 Granma (Bayamo, bayamés/-esa).

Other places in Cuba and their adjective forms or demonyms are Baracoa (baracoense), Moa (moense), Florida (floridano/-a), Palma Soriano (palmero/-a), Manzanillo (manzanillero/-a), Trinidad  (trinitario/-a).

See also
Provinces of Cuba
List of adjectival and demonymic forms of place names
List of adjectivals and demonyms for subcontinental regions
List of adjectival and demonymic forms for countries and nations

References

Cuba
Demonyms